Ukraine competed at the 1999 Summer Universiade in Palma de Mallorca, Spain, from 3 to 13 July 1999. Ukraine women's basketball team finished 4th, men's football team finished 11th, and women's volleyball team finished 13th. Ukraine did not compete in water polo.

Medal summary

Medal by sports

Medalists

See also
 Ukraine at the 1999 Winter Universiade

References

Nations at the 1999 Summer Universiade
1999 in Ukrainian sport
1999